Aretshalden is a village in Hinwil, Switzerland. It lies close to Pfäffikersee, north of Wetzikon.

Villages in the canton of Zürich